Kępy  is a village in the administrative district of Gmina Marianowo, within Stargard County, West Pomeranian Voivodeship, in north-western Poland. 

References

Villages in Stargard County